Tamatoa Wagemann (born 18 March 1980) is a footballer from Papeete, Tahiti, currently playing for AS Dragon. He is a member of the Tahiti national football team.

Career
Wagemann played one season for the German club SV Linx, which was promoted  in 2003 to Oberliga Baden-Württemberg, the fourth tier of German football. He moved on to Switzerland to play for FC Alle in 2004.

In 2007, he left Switzerland and signed for the French club SO Cholet, staying three years with the club and moving to US Changé in 2010 to play at CFA 2, the fifth tier in French football.

International career
Wagemann appeared twice for Tahiti before being selected for the squad that won the 2012 OFC Nations Cup. He started the first match of the tournament and appeared as a substitute in the following two, all during the group stage.

Honours
OFC Nations Cup:
 Winner (1): 2012

International career statistics

References

External links

1980 births
Living people
French Polynesian footballers
US Changé players
French Polynesian expatriate footballers
Tahiti international footballers
2012 OFC Nations Cup players
2013 FIFA Confederations Cup players
French Polynesian people of German descent
People from Papeete
Association football defenders
Association football midfielders
Expatriate footballers in Switzerland